Heliocheilus vulpinotatus is a moth in the family Noctuidae. It is endemic to the Australian Capital Territory, New South Wales and Queensland.

External links
Australian Faunal Directory

Heliocheilus
Moths of Australia